American Needle, Inc. v. National Football League, 560 U.S. 183 (2010), was a United States Supreme Court case regarding the ability of teams in the National Football League to conspire for purposes of a violation of §1 of the Sherman Antitrust Act.

Background 
The alleged conspiracy involved the formation of the National Football League Properties (NFLP), an entity responsible for licensing NFL intellectual property and formed in 1963. Before that date the NFL teams marketed their IP rights individually.

Between 1963 and 2000, the NFLP granted nonexclusive licenses to various suppliers permitting the manufacture and resale of apparel bearing team insignias. Petitioner, American Needle, Inc., was one of those license holders. In December 2000, the teams voted to authorize the NFLP to grant exclusive licenses from then on. The NFLP granted a 10-year exclusive license to Reebok to manufacture and sell trademarked headwear bearing team insignia of all 32 teams. After that the NFLP declined to renew American Needle's nonexclusive license.

Opinion of the Court 
The Court held that NFL teams are distinct economic actors with separate economic interests that are capable of conspiring under §1 of the Sherman Act.

See also 
 Mid-South Grizzlies v. National Football League
 Radovich v. National Football League
 List of United States Supreme Court cases, volume 560

References

Further reading 
He, Yifei American Needle Upon Remand,  https://ssrn.com/abstract=2520044

External links
 

2010 in American football
2010 in United States case law
National Football League controversies
National Football League litigation
United States antitrust case law
United States Supreme Court cases
United States Supreme Court cases of the Roberts Court